Sinseol-dong Station is a station on the Seoul Subway Line 1, the Seongsu Branch of Seoul Subway Line 2, and Ui LRT. There is a piece of track that connects the Line 1 and Line 2 stations, and Line 1 trains belonging to Seoul Metro are serviced at the Gunja Train Depot behind Yongdap Station using this connective track.

The B3 floor features an unused one-track platform. This used to be the original Line 2 platform. However, due to intermittent flooding, this platform was closed off, and a new platform on the B2 floor serves as the current Line 2 station. The track passing through this unused platform is currently used by Line 1 trains running light from Dongmyo Station to the Gunja Train Depot.

Gallery

References

Seoul Metropolitan Subway stations
Railway stations opened in 1974
Metro stations in Dongdaemun District
1974 establishments in South Korea
20th-century architecture in South Korea